National Highway 347B, commonly referred to as NH 347B is a national highway in  India. It is a spur road of National Highway 47. NH-347B traverses the state of Madhya Pradesh in India.

Route 

Kheri, Ashapur (excluding the stretch from Ashapur to Khandwa) Khandwa, Chhegaon Makhan (excluding stretch from Chhegaon Makhan to Deshgaon ) Bhikangaon, Deshgaon, Khargone, Julwania, Thikri, Anjad, Barwani.

Junctions  
 
  Terminal near Kheri.
  near Deshgaon
  near Khargone.
  near Julwania.

See also 

 List of National Highways in India
 List of National Highways in India by state

References

External links 

 NH 347B on OpenStreetMap

National highways in India
National Highways in Madhya Pradesh